Overton railway station was a very small flag station on the North Island Main Trunk and in the Manawatū-Whanganui region of New Zealand.

History 
The route of the Hunterville branch (later incorporated into the NIMT) was inspected on foot in 1884 and officially opened on Saturday 2 June 1888, when the station was served by two trains a week. By 1894 the branch had two trains a day.

Overton was first noted on 1 May 1888 and a 1 August 1895 note considered the necessity for a flag station. It seems to have had only a plain line until  1897, when it had a passing loop for 6 wagons. In 1898 it had a platform and by 1904 also a shelter shed. The loop was removed in October 1953 and the station closed to all traffic on Monday, 10 August 1959.

Overton House 

In June 1959 it was noted that the station was retained following negotiations with Mr N F Arkwright. Until 1926 the station was surrounded by the Overton estate. The estate was bought about 1882 by Francis Arkwright, who stood as a Member of Parliament for the seat of Rangitīkei, but was defeated in 1887 and 1890. He had a large Tudor revival house built in 1884. In 1990 the House was registered by Heritage New Zealand as a Category I heritage item, with registration number 187.

References

Defunct railway stations in New Zealand
Buildings and structures in Manawatū-Whanganui
Rail transport in Manawatū-Whanganui
Railway stations opened in 1888
Railway stations closed in 1959
1888 establishments in New Zealand
1959 disestablishments in New Zealand